Jonathan Valin (born November 23, 1947 in Cincinnati, Ohio) is an American mystery author best known for the Harry Stoner detective series.  He won the Shamus Award for best mystery novel of 1989. After writing eleven Harry Stoner novels over a 14-year period, he took a break from mystery writing to help found Fi, a magazine of music criticism. He now works as an editor and reviewer for magazines.

He is an alumnus of the University of Chicago and lived in Chicago for many years.

Reviews
 "(Jonathan Valin)'s writing is so fluid, his dialogue so crisp and his stories so well-plotted that each (Harry Stoner) novel is over too soon." --Sun-Sentinel, 1993 
 "Valin's latest is riveting, disturbing". --Miami Herald, 1989 
 "Since Mr. Valin is an expert writer who provides coherent plots and believable dialogue, it comes as no surprise that his Stoner books have taken hold." --New York Times, 1987

Bibliography
The Lime Pit (1980)
Final Notice (1980)
Dead Letter (1981)
Day of Wrath (1982)
Natural Causes (1983)
Life's Work (1986) (Anthony Award nominee, Best Novel)
Fire Lake (1987)
Extenuating Circumstances (1989) (Shamus Award winner, Best Novel)
Second Chance (1991) (Shamus Award nominee, Best Novel)
The Music Lovers (1993)
Missing (1995)

References

External links
 

American crime fiction writers
Writers from Cincinnati
Living people
1947 births
Shamus Award winners
American male novelists
Novelists from Ohio